"Watchin'" is a song by English dance music duo Freemasons. The song is a remake of Deborah Cox's "It's Over Now", from her 1998 album One Wish. It was released as the second single from their second studio album Unmixed and features vocals from British singer Amanda Wilson.

Track listing

Charts

References

2006 singles
Freemasons (band) songs
2006 songs